The Bingham-Brewer House is a historic home located at Rockville, Montgomery County, Maryland, United States. It is a two-story, Federal style brick house, with a Flemish Bond front facade, dating to 1821. Also on the property is a late-19th century smokehouse, privy, and a late-19th or early-20th century chicken house.

The Bingham-Brewer House was listed on the National Register of Historic Places in 1980.

References

External links
, including photo in 2000, at Maryland Historical Trust website

Federal architecture in Maryland
Houses completed in 1821
Houses in Montgomery County, Maryland
Houses on the National Register of Historic Places in Maryland
Buildings and structures in Rockville, Maryland
National Register of Historic Places in Montgomery County, Maryland